In the Micronesian mythology of Kiribati (formerly the Gilbert Islands) Uekera is a tree that reaches to the heavens; Te Kaintikuaba which is translated as the "tree of life" or "tree of knowledge" in Kiribati legend. It is said to have been planted in Buariki village in North Tarawa by Nei Tekanuea. The creation story is that spirits who lived in Te Kaintikuaba in Samoa, migrated northward carrying branches from the tree and created the islands of Tungaru (the Gilberts).  It is the inspiration for the name of the Kiribati weekly newspaper, Te Uekera.

Notes

References

A Combined Kiribati-English Dictionary compiled by Stephen Trussel and Gordon W. Groves, University of Hawaii, 1978.
Plants of Kiribati: A Listing and Analysis of Vernacular Names by R. R. Thaman.  Atoll Research Journal No. 296.  Issued by the Smithsonian Institution, August 1987.  Page 10.
Kiribati Communications
Aid workers find a new life in the Marshall Islands Taipei Times, Jan 27, 2004, Page 3.

Kiribati mythology
Trees in mythology